Bekrenevo is a rural locality (a village) in Sidorovskoye Rural Settlement, Gryazovetsky District, Vologda Oblast, Russia. The population was 59 as of 2002.

Geography 
Bekrenevo is located 49 km southeast of Gryazovets (the district's administrative centre) by road. Bakshino is the nearest rural locality.

References 

Rural localities in Gryazovetsky District